The 2017 Pan American Fencing Championships is held at the Centre Pierre-Charbonneau in Montreal from 13 to 18 June 2017. The event was organized by the Pan American Fencing Confederation and Canadian Fencing Federation.

Medal summary

Men's events

Women's events

Medal table

Results

Men

Foil individual

Épée individual

Sabre individual

Foil team

Épée team

Sabre team

Women

Foil individual

Épée individual

Sabre individual

Foil team

Épée team

Sabre team

References

External links 
 Results

2017
Pan American Fencing Championships
2017 in Canadian sports
International fencing competitions hosted by Canada
June 2017 sports events in Canada